Svara (Devanagari: स्वर, generally pronounced as swar) is a Sanskrit word that connotes simultaneously a breath, a vowel, the sound of a musical note corresponding to its name, and the successive steps of the octave or saptaka. More comprehensively, it is the ancient Indian concept about the complete dimension of musical pitch. Most of the time a svara is identified as both musical note and tone, but a tone is a precise substitute for sur, related to tunefulness. Traditionally, Indians have just seven svaras/notes with short names, e.g. saa, re/ri, ga, ma, pa, dha, ni  which Indian musicians collectively designate as saptak or saptaka. It is one of the reasons why svara is considered a symbolic expression for the number seven.

Origins and history

Etymology
The word swara or svara (Sanskrit: स्वर) is derived from the root svr which means "to sound". To be precise, the svara is defined in the Sanskrit nirukta system as:
svaryate iti svarah (स्वर्यते इति स्वरः, does breathing, shines, makes sound),
svayam raajate iti svarah (स्वयं राजते इति स्वरः, appears on its own) and
sva ranjayati iti svarah (स्व रञ्जयति इति स्वरः, that which colours itself in terms of appealing sound).

The Kannada word swara and Tamil alphabet or letter suram do not represent a sound, but rather more generally the place of articulation (PoA) (பிறப்பிடம்), where one generates a sound, and the sounds made there can vary in pitch.

In the Vedas

The word is found in the Vedic literature, particularly the Samaveda, where it means accent and tone, or a musical note, depending on the context. The discussion there focusses on three accent pitch or levels: svarita (sounded, circumflex normal), udatta (high, raised) and anudatta (low, not raised). However, scholars question whether the singing of hymns and chants were always limited to three tones during the Vedic era.

In the general sense swara means tone, and applies to chanting and singing. The basic swaras of Vedic chanting are udatta, anudatta and svarita. Vedic music has madhyama or ma as principal note so that tonal movement is possible towards lower and higher pitches, thus ma is taken for granted as fixed in any tonal music (madhyama avilopi, मध्यम अविलोपी).

One-swara Vedic singing is called aarchika chanting, e.g. in chanting the following texts on one note:
aum aum aum / om om om
hari om tatsat
shivoham shivoham
raam raam raam raam
raadhe raadhe
siyaa-raam siyaa-raam
or the like. Two-swara Vedic singing is called gaathika chanting, e.g. in chanting the following text on two notes:

The musical octave is said to have evolved from the elaborate and elongated chants of the Samaveda, based on these basic swaras. Siksha is the subject that deals with phonetics and pronunciation. Naradiya Siksha elaborates the nature of swaras, both Vedic chants and the octave.

In the Upaniṣads
The word also appears in the Upanishads. For example, it appears in Jaiminiya Upanishad Brahmana section 111.33, where the cyclic rise and setting of sun and world, is referred to as "the music of spheres", and the sun is stated to be "humming the wheel of the world". According to Ananda Coomaraswamy, the roots "svar", meaning "to shine" (whence "surya" or sun), and "svr", meaning "to sound or resound" (whence "swara", “musical note”) and also in some contexts "to shine", are all related in the ancient Indian imagination.

In Śāstra literature
The svara concept is found in Chapter 28 of the ancient Natya Shastra, estimated to have been completed between 200 BCE to 200 CE. It names the unit of tonal measurement or audible unit the śruti, with verse 28.21 introducing the musical scale as follows:

This text contains the modern names:

These seven swaras are shared by both major raga systems of Indian classical music, that is the North Indian (Hindustani) and South Indian (Carnatic).

Seven svaras and solfège (sargam)

Sapta svara, also called sapta swara or sapta sur, refers to the seven distinct notes of the octave or the seven successive svaras of a saptak. The sapta svara can be collectively referred to as the sargam (which is an acronym of the consonants of the first four svaras). Sargam is the Indian equivalent to solfège, a technique for the teaching of sight-singing. As in Western moveable-Do solfège, the svara Sa is the tonic of a piece or scale. The seven svaras of the saptak are the fundamentals of heptatonic scales or melakarta ragas and thaats in Carnatic and Hindustani classical music.

The seven svara are Shadja (षड्ज), Rishabh (ऋषभ), Gandhar (गान्धार), Madhyam (मध्यम), Pancham (पंचम), Dhaivat (धैवत) and Nishad (निषाद). The svaras of the sargam are often learnt in abbreviated form: sā, ri (Carnatic) or re (Hindustani), ga, ma, pa, dha, ni. Of these, the first svara that is "sa", and the fifth svara that is "pa", are considered anchors (achal svaras) that are unalterable, while the remaining have flavours ( and  svaras) that differs between the two major systems.

Interpretation
North Indian Hindustani music has fixed name of a relative pitch, but South Indian Carnatic music keeps on making interchanges of the names of pitches in case of ri-ga and dha-ni whenever required. Swaras appear in successive steps in an octave. More comprehensively, swara-graam (scale)  is the practical concept of Indian music comprising seven + five= twelve most useful musical pitches. Sage Matanga made a very important statement in his Brihaddeshi some 1500 years ago that:
i.e. Shadja, Rishabh, Gandhar, ... (and their utterance) are not the real svaras but their pronunciation in the form of aa-kar, i-kaar, u-kaar ... are the real form of the svaras.

It is said that Shadja is the basic svara from which all the other 6 svaras are produced. When we break the word Shadja then we get, Shad- And -Ja. Shad is 6 and ja is 'giving birth' in Indian languages. So basically the translation is :
  षड् - 6, ज -जन्म . Therefore, it collectively means giving birth to the other 6 notes of the music.

The absolute frequencies for all svaras are variable, and are determined relative to the saptak or octave. E.g. given Sa 240 Hz, Re 270 Hz, Ga 288 Hz, Ma 320 Hz, Pa 360 Hz, Dha 405 Hz, and Ni 432 Hz, then the Sa after the Ni of 432 Hz has a frequency of 480 Hz i.e. double that of the lower octave Sa, and similarly all the other 6 svaras. Considering the Sa of the Madhya Saptak then frequencies of the other svaras will be,
                   Sa      Re       Ga     Ma      Pa      Dha     Ni
   Mandra Saptak: 120 Hz, 135 Hz, 144 Hz, 160 Hz, 180 Hz, 202.5 Hz, 216 Hz.}
   Madhya Saptak: 240 Hz, 270 Hz, 288 Hz, 320 Hz, 360 Hz, 405 Hz, 432 Hz.} 
    Taara Saptak: 480 Hz, 540 Hz, 576 Hz, 640 Hz, 720 Hz, 810 Hz, 864 Hz.}

All the other svaras except Shadja (Sa) and Pancham (Pa) can be  or  svaras but Sa and Pa are always shuddha svaras. And hence svaras Sa and Pa are called achal svaras, since these svaras don't move from their original position. Svaras Ra, Ga, Ma, Dha, Ni are called chal svaras, since these svaras move from their original position.
     Sa, Re, Ga, Ma, Pa, Dha, Ni - Shuddha Svaras
     Re, Ga, Dha, Ni - Komal Svaras
     Ma -  Svaras

Talking about Shrutis of these Sapta Svaras, 
 Sa, Ma and Pa have four Shrutis, respectively
 Re and Dha have three Shrutis, respectively
 Ga and Ni have two Shrutis, respectively
And these all Shrutis add up to 22 Shrutis in total.

Relationship to śruti

The svara differs slightly from the śruti concept in Indian music. Both the swara and the śruti are but the sounds of music. According to the music scholars of the distant past, the śruti is generally understood as a microtone besides veda and an ear.  In the context of advanced music, a śruti is the smallest gradation of pitch that a human ear can detect and a singer or instrument can produce. There are 22 śruti or microtones in a saptaka of Hindustani music but Carnatic music assumes 24 śruti. A svara is a selected pitch from 22 śrutis, using several of such svaras a musician constructs scales, melodies and ragas. In the presence of a drone-sound of perfectly tuned Tanpuras, an ideal svara sounds sweet and appealing to human ear but particularly some 10 śrutis of the saptaka sound out of pitch (besuraa) when compared to the very drone. A tuneful and pleasing tone of the svara is located at a fixed interval but there is no fixed interval defined for two consecutive śrutis anywhere that can safely and scientifically be used throughout with respect to a perfect drone sound.

The ancient Sanskrit text Natya Shastra by Bharata identifies and discusses twenty two shruti and seven shuddha and two vikrita swara. The Natya Shastra mentions that in Shadja graama, the swara pairs saa-ma and saa-pa are samvaadi swaras (consonant pair) and are located at the interval of 9 and 13 shruti respectively. Similarly, swara pairs re-dha and ga-ni are samvaadi swara too. Without giving any example of 'a standard measure' or 'equal interval' between two successive shrutis, Bharata declared that saa, ma or pa shall have an interval of 4 shrutis measured from the pitch of the preceding swara, re or dha shall have an interval of 3 shrutis measured from the pitch of the preceding swara and ga or ni shall have an interval of 2 shrutis measured from the pitch of the preceding swara respectively. The following quote explains it all:{{blockquote|
चतुश्चतुश्चतुश्चैव षड्जमध्यमपञ्चमाः 
द्वे द्वे निषादगान्धारौ त्रिस्त्री ऋषभधैवतौ
Chatush chatush chatush chaiva shadja madhyama panchamaah.Dve dve nishaada gaandhaarau tristrii  rishabha dhaivatau.}}
Bharata also makes some unscientific and unacceptable observations ignoring practically proven truths like samvaad (samvaada/ संवाद) or consonance of ma-ni, re-dha, re-pa and ga-ni as each of these swara pairs do not have equal number of shrutis to establish samvaad. In reality, the above-mentioned pairs DO create samvaad or consonances which Bharata did  not recognize for unknown reasons. None of the musicologists give in writing the 'practical basis' or technique of ascertaining the ideal tonal gap between the note pairs like saa-re, re-ga, ga-ma, ma-pa, pa-dha, dha-ni, ni-saa* (taar saa) until Sangeet Paarijat of Ahobal (c. 1650). The swara studies in ancient Sanskrit texts include the musical gamut and its tuning, categories of melodic models and the raga compositions.

Perhaps the greats like Bharata, Sage Matanga and Shaarnga-deva did not know the secret of tuneful tones (up to acceptable level of normal human ear, on the basis of taanpuraa drone) for they do not mention use of drone sound for any of the musical purposes. Most of the practicing musicians knew very well that all the tuneful tones of seven notes could be discovered with the help of the theory of samvaad, in which saa-saa* (*means upper octave), saa-ma and saa-pa play the most crucial role.

Notation and practice
As per the widely used Bhatkhande Svara Lipi (Bhakthande's Swar Notation script), a dot above a letter (svara symbol) indicates that the note is sung one saptak (octave) higher, and a dot below indicates one saptak lower.  notes are indicated by an underscore, and the  Ma has a line on top which can be vertical or horizontal. (Or, if a note with the same name - Sa, for example - is an octave higher than the note represented by S, an apostrophe is placed to the right: S'.  If it is an octave lower, the apostrophe is placed to the left: 'S. Apostrophes can be added as necessary to indicate the octave: for example, ``g would be the note komal Ga in the octave two octaves below that which begins on the note S (that is, two octaves below g).) In other words, the basic rule is that the number of dots or apostrophes above or below the svara symbol means the number of times dots or apostrophes, respectively, above or below the corresponding svara in madhya saptak (middle octave).

The basic mode of reference is that which is equivalent to the Western Ionian mode or major scale (called Bilaval thaat in Hindustani music, Sankarabharanam in Carnatic).  All relationships between pitches follow from this.  In any seven-tone mode (starting with S), R, G, D, and N can be natural (lit. 'pure') or flat ('soft') but never sharp, and the M can be natural or sharp but never flat, making twelve notes as in the Western chromatic scale. If a swara is not natural, a line below a letter indicates that it is flat and an acute accent above indicates that it is sharp ('intense'). Sa and Pa are immovable (once Sa is selected), forming a just perfect fifth.

In some notation systems, the distinction is made with capital and lowercase letters. When abbreviating these tones, the form of the note which is relatively lower in pitch always uses a lowercase letter, while the form which is higher in pitch uses an uppercase letter. So  Re/Ri uses the letter r and  Re/Ri, the letter R, but  Ma uses m because it has a raised form -  Ma - which uses the letter M. Sa and Pa are always abbreviated as S and P, respectively, since they cannot be altered.

Svaras in Carnatic music
The svaras in Carnatic music are slightly different in the twelve-note system. Each svara is either prakr̥ti (invariant) or vikr̥ti (variable). Ṣaḍjam and Pañcamam are prakr̥ti svaras, whilst R̥ṣabham, Gāndhāram, Mādhyamam, Dhaivatam and Niṣādam are vikr̥ti svaras. Ma has two variants, and each of Ri, Ga, Dha and Ni has three variants. The mnemonic syllables for each vikṛti svara use the vowels "a", "i" and "u" successively from lowest to highest.  For example, r̥ṣabham has the three ascending variants "ra", "ri" and "ru", being respectively 1, 2 and 3 semitones above  the tonic note, ṣaḍjam.

As you can see above, Catuśruti Ṛṣabham and Śuddha Gāndhāram share the same pitch (3rd key/position). Hence if C is chosen as Ṣaḍjam, D would be both Catuśruti R̥ṣabham and Śuddha Gāndhāram. Hence they will not occur in same rāgam together. Similarly for the two svaras each at pitch positions 4, 10 and 11.

 Cultural, spiritual, and religious symbolism 

 Each svara is associated with the sound produced by a particular animal or a bird, like, 
 Sa is said to be sourced from the cry of a peacock,
 Ri is said to be sourced from the lowing of a bull,
 Ga is said to be sourced from the bleating of a goat,
 Ma is said to be sourced from call of the heron,
 Pa is said to be sourced from call of the cuckoo,
 Dha is said to be sourced from the neighing of the horse,
 Ni is said to be sourced from the trumpeting of the elephant.

So each svara is said to be sourced from the sound produced by an animal or a bird.

 Each svara is also associated with a classical planet:
 Sa – Mercury,          
 Re – Mars,                    
 Ga – Sun,                   
 Ma – Moon, 
 Pa - Saturn,
 Dha – Jupiter, 
 Ni -  Venus.
 Each svara is also associated with a colour:
 Sa – Green,          
 Re – Red,                    
 Ga – Golden,                   
 Ma – White, 
 Pa - Blue or Black,
 Dha – Yellow, 
 Ni -  Multi coloured.
Each svara is also associated with the 7 Chakras in the body:
 Sa - Muladhara
 Re - Svadisthana
 Ga - Manipura
 Ma - Anahata
 Pa - Vishuddhi
 Dha - Ajna
 Ni - Sahasrara

 See also 

 Hindustani classical music
 Indian classical dance
 Carnatic music
 Ancient Tamil music
 Gamak
 Raga

References

Bibliography

Further reading
Mathieu, W. A. (1997). Harmonic Experience: Tonal Harmony from Its Natural Origins to Its Modern Expression''. Inner Traditions Intl Ltd. . An auto didactic ear-training and sight-singing book that uses singing sargam syllables over a drone in a just intonation system based on perfect fifths and major thirds.

External links
North India Sargam Notation System
www.soundofindia.com Article on vivadi svaras, by Haresh Bakshi
The twelve notes in an octave in Indian classical music

Indian classical music
Musical notation
Musical scales
Hindustani music terminology
Carnatic music terminology